Ray White (full name Ray Shirley White Sr) is an American soul vocalist and rock and blues guitarist, best known as a member of Frank Zappa's touring ensembles.  He was drafted into Zappa's band in late 1976, being featured on rhythm guitar and vocals, forming a vocal harmony partnership with Ike Willis on later tours in 1980 and 1984. White's vocals can be heard on Zappa in New York (March 1978), You Are What You Is (September 1981) as well as others. White can also be found on a The Torture Never Stops and Does Humor Belong in Music?; the former is a DVD from Zappa's 1981 tour (without Ike Willis) and the latter filmed at the pier in New York in 1984; the video features White and Ike Willis' vocal harmonies. According to Zappa, White, who was deeply religious, was uncomfortable with the atheistic views of some of the other band members, which led to his departure.

White has also worked with jam-oriented groups like KVHW, Don't Push the Clown and Umphrey's McGee since his contributions to the Zappa band, and has worked with a variety of Michigan artists, including former Rare Earth drummer Bob Weaver, as well as members of the funk/fusion combo Generic Produce.

In 2007 Ray White joined Dweezil Zappa as a special guest for the Zappa Plays Zappa Tour. White is also a member of the group Band From Utopia, formed by former members of different formations of Frank Zappa's band who wanted to pay tribute to his work.

References

External links 
 Official Ray White website
 United Mutations
 Project Object

African-American rock musicians
American male singers
American rock guitarists
American male guitarists
Living people
Year of birth missing (living people)
African-American guitarists
21st-century African-American people